Grevillea rudis is a species of flowering plant in the family Proteaceae and is endemic to the south-west of Western Australia. It is a loose, spreading to erect shrub with divided leaves, the end lobes more or less triangular to oblong and sharply pointed, and more or less cylindrical clusters of cream-coloured flowers, the style turning pink as it ages.

Description
The lower surface of the leaves is scaly at first, later glabrous.

This grevillea is similar to G.althoferorum but has less deeply divided leaves, the flowers held above the foliage.

Taxonomy
Grevillea rudis was first formally described in 1855 Carl Meisnerin Hooker's Journal of Botany and Kew Garden Miscellany from specimens collected by James Drummond. The specific epithet (rudis) means "rough" or "wild", referring to the leaves and branches.

Distribution and habitat
This grevillea grows in well-drained laterite between Eneabba, Jurien Bay and Watheroo in the Coolgardie, Geraldton Sandplains and Swan Coastal Plain bioregions of south-western Western Australia.

Conservation status
Grevillea rudis is listed as "Priority Four" by the Government of Western Australia Department of Biodiversity, Conservation and Attractions, meaning that it is rare or near threatened.

See also
 List of Grevillea species

References

rudis
Endemic flora of Western Australia
Eudicots of Western Australia
Proteales of Australia
Taxa named by Carl Meissner
Plants described in 1855